The 2017–18 Ukrainian Cup  was the 27th annual season of Ukraine's football knockout competition. The competition was planned to be started on 9 July 2017 and concluded on 9 May 2018.

This season the competition's administration was passed on to the Football Federation of Ukraine that previously was conducted by both the Premier League and Professional Football League. The number of participants has increased to 52 and is the biggest in the last five years. The FFU also promised to introduce a system of bonuses for this season's competition, yet did not disclosed them.

All competition rounds consisted of a single game with a home field advantage granted to a team from lower league. Qualification for the competition is granted to all professional clubs and finalists of the Ukrainian Amateur Cup as long as those clubs will be able to pass the season's attestation (licensing).

FC Shakhtar Donetsk was the defending winner for the last two seasons. The Donetsk club has reached the competition finals in the last seven years winning five of them. There were around 300 clubs over the history of competition and it is a debut season for seven of them, Dnipro-1, Ahrobiznes, Metalist 1925, Polissya, Tavriya Simferopol, Sudnobudivnyk, and Prykarpattia. Both qualified amateur clubs have already participated in the competition before. It should be mentioned that only 10 clubs participated in every season of the tournament.

Team allocation and schedule

Distribution

Rounds schedule

Competition schedule

First Preliminary round (1/64)

In this round entered three representatives from the First League, 21 clubs from the Second League, two representatives from the Amateur Cup. The draw for this round that took place 30 June 2017 at the House of Football in Kyiv was announced on 27 June 2017. The round matches were played on 9 July 2017. The archive of Ukrainian Association of Football "Footpass" shows the Premier League club NK Veres Rivne playing at the first preliminary round instead of FC Lviv (please, see Veres – Lviv swap). The clubs' "swap" occurred only next season, while the archive has been updated to show something that is completely wrong.

Notes:
 On 5 July 2017 the club director of Skala Stryi confirmed that the club will not show up for the cup game against Tavriya. On 24 July 2017 it was announced that the FFU Control and Disciplinary Committee awarded a technical loss to Skala (0:3) and fined it for 5,000 hryvnias.
 On 5 July 2017 it was announced that Metalist 1925 answered to the call of Nyva Ternopil and agreed to play the game in Kharkiv. Related documents were sent up to the Football Federation of Ukraine. On 7 July 2017 the arrangement was approved and Metalist 1925 will host Nyva at Sonyachny Training Center.
 On 6 July 2017 number of clubs announced that they have various major issues in taking part of the competition, among which are FC Arsenal-Kyivshchyna Bila Tserkva, FC Metalurh Zaporizhia, FC Sudnobudivnyk Mykolaiv (the last two, because of problems with their stadiums). On the other hand, both FC Ternopil and FC Lviv confirmed that they are ready for the competition. FC Lviv announced that it will play its first game of Ukrainian Cup competition in Rava-Ruska. On 7 July 2017 the Football Federation of Ukraine approved to conduct the game between Metalurh and Polissya at Kolos Stadium in Chkalove, Nikopol Raion as well as the game between Sudnobudivnyk and Balkany that took place on 10 July 2017 at Ivan Stadium in Odessa.

Second Preliminary round (1/32)
In this round will include 15 more representatives from the First League in addition to the two that advanced from the previous round as well as 10 clubs from the Second League and one representatives from the Amateur Cup. The draw for this round that took place on 13 July 2017 at the House of Football in Kyiv was announced on 11 July 2017. The round matches will be played on 26 July 2017, while the game between Tavriya and Nyva-V might take place later as Tavriya shares home stadium with Enerhiya Nova Kakhovka. Later (21 July 2017) it was confirmed that the date for the game Tavriya – Nyva-V is 27 July 2017.

Third Preliminary round (1/16)
In this round the first 6 representatives from the Premier League will enter the competition along with the 14 teams that advanced from the previous round including 8 clubs from the First League, 5 clubs from the Second League, and one representatives from the Amateur Cup. The draw for this round was held on 4 August 2017 at the House of Football in Kyiv and was announced on 1 August 2017. The round matches were played on 20 September 2017.

Round of 16 (1/8)
In this round the final 6 representatives from the Premier League will enter the competition along with the 10 teams that advanced from the previous round including 4 teams from the Premier League, 2 teams from the First League and 4 teams from the Second League. The draw was without seeds and was held on 27 September 2017. The round matches were played on 25 October 2017.

Quarterfinals (1/4)
In this round advanced 5 representatives from the Premier League, a team from the First League and 2 teams from the Second League. The draw was without seeds and was held on 31 October 2017 in the House of Football, Kyiv. The round matches were played on 29 November 2017.

Semifinals (1/2)
In this round advanced 3 representatives from the Premier League and a team from the Second League. The draw was without seeds and was held on 2 March 2018. SC Dnipro-1 will play its semifinal game at home as being from the lowest league. The round matches are scheduled to be played on 18 April 2018.

Final

Bracket
The following is the bracket which the Ukrainian Cup resembled. Numbers in parentheses next to the match score represent the results of a penalty shoot-out.

Top goalscorers
The competition's top ten goalscorers including qualification rounds.

Notes:
 there were 2 own goals scored during the first round, 2 own goals during the second round, one in the third round.

See also 
2017–18 Ukrainian Premier League
2017–18 Ukrainian First League
2017–18 Ukrainian Second League
2017–18 UEFA Europa League
2017–18 Ukrainian Amateur Cup

Notes

References

External links
 The competition's provisions. Football Federation of Ukraine. Approved on 7 July 2017
 2017–18 Season regulations. Professional Football League of Ukraine and Football Federation of Ukraine
 Official results of the First preliminary round. Football Federation of Ukraine. 9 July 2017 (including the game played on 10 July)
 Valerko, A. ''Starting round of the Ukrainian Cup. How it's been (Стартовый раунд Кубка Украины. Как это было). Sport Arena. 11 July 2017

Cup
Ukrainian Cup
Ukrainian Cup seasons